Silver Creek in southern Idaho refers to two different streams. One is a spring-fed tributary of the Little Wood River in Blaine County, north of Picabo, and the other is a tributary of the Middle Fork of the Payette River in Boise County, near Crouch.

Little Wood tributary
The Little Wood River tributary is formed by dozens of springs bubbling up from an aquifer, which form a stream. It is an example of a high desert, cold-spring ecosystem, and attracts a variety of wildlife, including 150 species of birds.

Location (mouth):

Payette River tributary
The Payette River tributary, approximately 100 miles (160 km) northwest, has brook trout and is stocked with rainbow trout.

Location (mouth):

Notes

External links
The Nature Conservancy Silver Creek page
Panoramic photo of Silver Creek

Rivers of Idaho